Flora Walsh (July 25, 1870 – January 22, 1893) was an American stage actress during the 19th century. Her career started around the age of 9 as part of a juvenile theatre company, where her soprano voice earned her recognition and opportunities to act in leading roles on stage. Her mother Alice would frequently appear in productions alongside her up until the early 1890s. She married actor-playwright Charles H. Hoyt in 1887. 

During what would be her last theatrical appearance on January 12, 1893, at age 22, she fell ill, soon developed pneumonia, and died on January 22, 1893, in Boston, Massachusetts, with her husband and mother present. Her funeral took place in the Charlestown neighborhood of Boston.

Early life
Walsh was born on July 25, 1870, in San Francisco, California. Her father Edward Walsh was a civil engineer, and her mother Alice was a character actress famous on the Pacific Coast, who appeared in plays alongside her daughter until around 1891, at which point she joined her as a companion. Her father was born in Canada and her mother in England. According to the 1880 census, she was the eldest of three children and had a younger brother and sister. Her mother was believed to be worth several thousand dollars and expressed a desire to see Flora become a star.

Career

Walsh first became noticed as part of a juvenile production of "H.M.S. Pinafore" where in 1879, aged 9, she was described as being "the most extraordinary performer of her age that we have ever seen" with high praise for her acting and singing abilities. One of her earlier successful performances was at the Tivoli in San Francisco, where a singing role earned her wider recognition. Her appetite for the stage developed from an early age, and although her first part was intended only to be a minor one, her natural singing voice earned her the leading role at the age of 12. She subsequently traveled the western circuit singing opera and later featured in a production of Muldoon's Picnic. Walsh was the recipient of a benefit performance in 1882 at the Baldwin Theater in San Francisco when Dot, or the Cricket on the Hearth" was presented.

By the age of 15, despite having appeared on the local stage only occasionally, Walsh was described by The Boston Globe as a natural "remarkable dancer", having never had any formal tuition; she was also described as a "chubby child". In the fall of 1885, her dramatic company was playing in towns in Colorado when they got stranded in the Rocky Mountains, 60 miles away from the nearest railroad. With little chance of leaving, they spent the winter in the mountain town of Aspen. Walsh became a popular performer there, making many friends among the local people. Amateur actors and actresses in the town would occasionally entertain in the town's only opera house, the Rink Opera House, and producers would consider the success of their performance a near certainty if they engaged Walsh. During her stay, several benefit performances were provided by the local population to show their appreciation to Walsh and her contribution to their entertainment.

Her last theatrical appearance was on January 12, 1893, at the Tremont Theatre, where she played Bossy Brander in A Texas Steer. She had been performing in this play for over a year, including at the New Park Theatre on Broadway in 1891.

Death
During her last performance, Walsh was described as being "distressed by a severe cold" and had difficulty speaking. As her cold progressed, an abscess appeared on her neck, and she endured excruciating pain for several days. The abscess was lanced but, instead of healing, she developed pneumonia and ultimately succumbed to the disease.

Walsh died on January 22, 1893, in Boston, Massachusetts, at the Parker House following a ten-day illness. She was 22 years old. In her presence were her husband and mother. The funeral took place in the Charlestown neighborhood of Boston. Her death "cast a gloom" over her company, and her widower husband ceased watching the play following her death. Tim Murphy, who had performed alongside Walsh, noted she would not be forgotten by the acting company, nor her manner of moving "about like a ray of sunshine, cheering everyone by the geniality of her kindly disposition".

Personal life
Walsh married author and playwright Charles H. Hoyt on July 12, 1887, in Hoyt's country home, two weeks before her 17th birthday. The occasion was an intimate affair of friends and close family due to the ill health of Hoyt's father. Among the guests was actor and comedian Otis Harlan. Hoyt met Walsh when she was engaged to appear in a production of Rag Baby around October 1885, starring Hoyt at Bush Street Theater in San Francisco, after one of the actresses on the opening night, Annie Leslie, withdrew due to illness. Hoyt was impressed by her performances and wrote a play, A Tin Soldier'', specifically to provide her with better acting opportunities. While studying her acting methods he fell in love with her, and they were engaged to marry before the play was complete. They married soon afterwards, with Walsh earning an "enviable position among the leading soubrettes of the day". She was the first wearer of Hoyt's private collection of jewels, valued at nearly $50,000 in 1902 following his death.

References
Citations

1870 births
1893 deaths
19th-century American actresses
Actresses from San Francisco
American stage actresses
Deaths from pneumonia in Massachusetts